The Houghton Poultry Research Station was a poultry disease research station in northern Cambridgeshire.

By the 1970s, the site was the largest centre for poultry disease in the world.

History
The site opened in 1948. It was government-run from 1956. On the board was Emmanuel Amoroso, Sir Kenneth Mather (vice-chancellor from 1965-1971 of the University of Southampton) and Trevor Stamp, 3rd Baron Stamp. The virologist Prof Peter Wildy was a chairman of the site.

The site became known in 1986 as the Houghton Laboratory of the Institute of Animal Health.

The site closed in the 1992 due to budget realignments. It had been planned to close the site in August 1989.

Research
In 1949 it found a strain of Eimeria tenella known as the Houghton strain, which allowed the researchers to study the Eimeria lifecycle. The site also researched coccidiosis.

It worked in the 1960s with the British Egg Marketing Board, collaborating with the University of Liverpool on research on avian infectious bronchitis.<ref>Times 9 December 1964, page 17</ref>

It developed a vaccine for Marek's disease in the 1960s. In 1967 this disease was costing the industry £7m or about 2.5% of revenue.

Peter Biggs attended the 1967 World Poultry Congress in Kiev. He showed that cancer in poultry was heritable, due to the cancer complex of Leucosis, Marek's disease and acute Marek's disease. Leucosis alone caused 40% of mortality in egg-producing breeds.

Herbert Williams-Smith FRS was head of microbiology until May 1984. In 1969 a report on antibiotic growth promoters (AGPs) recommended a restriction of tetracycline, due to antibiotic resistance, which had been investigated by Herbert Williams-Smith in the early 1970s.

Directors
 Prof Frank Minett August 1950 - December 1953 (his death)
 Peter Biggs January 1974 - (became FRS in March 1976)
 Jim Payne 1986 - 1992

Structure
It was sited in Huntingdonshire off the A1123 near the junction with the B1090 Sawtry Way. The site has been redeveloped.

It had 33 laboratories. Its chickens laid around 2000 eggs a week.

See also
 Avian Pathology, journal
 British Poultry Science'', journal
 British Society of Animal Science
 Microbiology Society
 National Animal Disease Information Service

References

External links
 Poultry Health Course
 WPSA UK

1948 establishments in England
1992 disestablishments in England
Agricultural research institutes in the United Kingdom
Animal health in England
Animal virology
Buildings and structures in Huntingdonshire
History of Huntingdonshire
Microbiology institutes
Molecular biology institutes
Poultry research institutes
Research institutes established in 1948
Organizations disestablished in 1992
Research institutes in Cambridgeshire
Veterinary research institutes
Virology institutes
Veterinary medicine in the United Kingdom